Alexander Stepanek (born 11 July 1963) is a former professional German tennis player who represented West Germany.

Career
After making it through qualifying, Stepanek played Kent Carlsson in the opening round of the 1986 French Open. He lost in straight sets.

The West German made the round of 16 at Bordeaux and Madrid in 1986.

Challenger titles

Singles: (1)

References

1963 births
Living people
German male tennis players
West German male tennis players
Tennis players from Munich